Tonopah may refer to:

 Tonopah, Arizona, a community
 Tonopah, Nevada, a community and eponym of the Boston-Tonopah Mining Company and  Tonopah Club
 Tonopah Airport Committee, a community group for acquiring a 1940s airstrip 
 Tonopah Times-Bonanza, the community's newspaper in 1942
 Tonopah Air Force Station, a Cold War radar station along with Las Vegas Air Force Station
 Tonopah Basin, Central Basin and Range ecoregions around the Tonopah Playas
 Tonopah Bombing Range, the 1940 World War II designation of the military region
Tonopah Bombing and Gunnery Range, the 1948 facility transferred to Air Training Command 
 Tonopah Air Force Base, the 1949 main base for the bombing range
 Tonopah Army Air Field, the main base's name in World War II
 Tonopah Test Range, a nuclear test area SW of the Tonopah Bombing Range
 Tonopah Test Range Airport
 USS Tonopah, the ship renamed from Monitor USS Nevada (BM-8) in 1909

Railroads
 Las Vegas and Tonopah Railroad
 Tonopah and Goldfield Railroad
 Tonopah and Tidewater Railroad